Renée Clerc (28 January 1927 – April 1970) was a Swiss alpine skier. She competed in the women's slalom at the 1948 Winter Olympics.

References

External links
 

1927 births
1970 deaths
Swiss female alpine skiers
Olympic alpine skiers of Switzerland
Alpine skiers at the 1948 Winter Olympics
People from Le Locle
Sportspeople from the canton of Neuchâtel
20th-century Swiss women